Pseudophytoecia suturalis is a species of beetle in the family Cerambycidae. It was described by Per Olof Christopher Aurivillius in 1914. It is known from Kenya.

References

Saperdini
Beetles described in 1914